A swing is a seat, often found at playgrounds for children, at a circus for acrobats, or on a porch for relaxing, although they may also be items of indoor furniture, such as the Latin American hammock or the Indian oonjal. The seat of a swing may be suspended from chains or ropes. Once a swing is in motion, it continues to oscillate like a pendulum until external interference or drag brings it to a halt. Swing sets are very popular with children.

On playgrounds, several swings are often suspended from a shared metal or wooden frame, known as a swing set, allowing more than one child to play at a time. Such swings come in a variety of sizes and shapes. For infants and toddlers, swings with leg holes support the child in an upright position while a parent or sibling pushes the child to get a swinging motion. Some swing sets include play items other than swings, such as a rope ladder or sliding pole.

For older children, swings are sometimes made of a flexible canvas seat, of a rubberized ventilated tire tread, of plastic, or of wood. A common backyard sight is a wooden plank suspended on both sides by ropes from a tree branch.

Types

Tire swings are a form of swing made from a whole tire. These are often simply a new or used tire hanging from a tree on a rope. On commercially-developed playground swing sets, oversized new tires are often reinforced with a circular metal bar to improve safety and are hung on chains from metal or wooden beams. They may hang vertically or hang flat, suspended from three or more points on one side. The flat version can hold three or more children. Pumping is achieved by using one or two of the three chains attached to the swing, and two (or more) children can pump in turn.

Tire swings can also be used in spinners, where the occupants use their feet to propel the tire.

Natural swings may be created by lianas (creeper plants) in a subtropical wild forest like Aokigahara forest near Mount Fuji.

Rope swings are swings created by tying one end of a length of rope to a tree branch, bridge, or other elevated structure. A knot or loop is usually put on the other end to prevent fraying and help the swinger stay on. Rope swings are often situated so that those swinging on them can let go and land in water deep enough to cushion the fall and to be swum around in.

The incorporation of a shortboard such as a skateboard in which the rider stands is called swing boarding. It is made safer by the use of an attached board and a harness for the rider.

Baby swings are swings with a bucket shape with holes for the child's legs, or a half-bucket shape and a safety belt, that is intended to reduce the likelihood of a very young child from falling out.

 are swinging, conventionally painted wood, bench-like seats intended primarily for adults.  The swing's suspension chains are permanently mounted to the porch ceiling; and the seat is typically large enough to seat about three people, with an armrest at each end.  Porch swings are an alternative to using rocking chairs or gliders outdoors.

Canopy swings are similar to porch swings, but they are hung on a separate frame and are usually portable. The name is derived from a canopy installed as a sunshade.

Hammock swings are portable (removable) bed-swings made of a lightweight material such as canvas, netting (or as little as two ropes), typically suspended between two trees or attached to a hammock stand.

Tandem swings are swings designed for use by two people at the same time, facing each other or back-to-back, and are almost always part of a swing set due to the frame required to support the weights of the riders. The bench is perpendicular to its frame's center crossbar. Face-to-face tandem benches include a subframe with integrated handles and foot pegs.  Back-to-back tandems are typically in the baby bucket design, but with two pairs of leg holes, one on each side of the bench. Tandem swings are typically suspended from their frame (as in kiiking) by steel bars, although ropes and chains may be used for those used only by smaller children. Face-to-face tandem swings were featured in the playground of the Columbia Gardens.

Nest swings resemble bird nests in shape and are able to carry multiple people. One or two people propel it by standing on the sides, grabbing the shackles that mount the basket to its typically wooden stand, and tilting it sideways. They are typically installed on playgrounds.

History

Asia
Swinging first spread throughout China during the Spring and Autumn Period (771-476 BC). In the Han dynasty swinging continued to rise in popularity and was often performed at the Qingming Festival and the Duanwu Festival. By the time of the Song dynasty, swinging became involved in professional acrobatics, where performers would swing between boats over water.

Europe
The earliest known representations of swings come from artifacts found in Greece. A terracotta sculpture of a woman sitting on a swing was found at Hagia Triada dated to the Late New Palace period (1450–1300 BC).

In the 1700s, French artists depicted scenes of nobility swinging recreationally.

Charles Wicksteed is thought to be the inventor of the modern-day swing. In 2013, one of his prototypes was unearthed near Wicksteed Park in the United Kingdom dating back to the early 1920s.

In 1993, the sport of Kiiking was invented in Estonia. Players attempt to rotate 360 degrees around a spindle, on a long swing consisting of a seat hung with steel bars.

North America
In the early 1900s, the playground movement saw swings installed in public spaces for neighborhood children. By the middle of the century, the suburban playground became popular. Many Americans put personal swing sets on their property. Public concern for children's safety influenced a change in design after the 1970s. Tubular metal sets were replaced with smaller swings made of woods and resins better suited for children.

The United States Patent and Trademark Office was disparaged in 2002 for issuing a patent to a five-year-old boy who claimed to have invented swinging sideways as a new form of entertainment.  His father, a patent lawyer who wanted to show his son how the patent system worked, had told the boy that he could file a patent application on anything that he invented. The patent was rescinded upon re-examination.

Dangers
Swings can cause various types of injuries. The most common injury is due to a fall, either by unintentionally letting go of the ropes or chains or by deliberately jumping out of the swing.  Less commonly, the person using the swing will bump into or kick another person who is walking by or playing too close to the swing, or (especially with improperly located home equipment) will bump into a fence, wall, or another fixed object.  Swings are also associated with strangulation or hanging injuries, usually because the child was wearing a piece of clothing or other item that became entangled in the swing.

Swings are the most common cause of injury relating to playground equipment at private homes, but a much less common cause of injury in public or school playgrounds, where injuries from climbing equipment dominate.  Injuries from swings primarily affect school-age children, but preschool-age children also have a significant risk on swing sets at home.

Potential benefits 
Swinging teaches full body coordination and improves the sensory system of a child. It develops spatial awareness, gross and fine motor skills. It works out the entire body from pumping legs to grip strength. Swinging also helps teach the child rhythm and balance, and encourages social interaction as children must cooperate and play together. In his 1885 poem, "The Swing," published in A Child's Garden of Verses, Robert Louis Stevenson exclaimed that going "up in a swing" was "the pleasantest thing/ Ever a child can do."

Gallery

See also
 Outdoor playset
 Swing ride
 Giant Swing
 Russian swing
 Sex swing
 Village swing

References

External links

Playground equipment
Seats
Physical activity and dexterity toys